Horton is a village and civil parish in Somerset, England, situated  north of Chard in the South Somerset district.  The village has a population of 812.

History

It is first attested as Horton in 1242. The place-name Horton is a common one in England. It derives from Old English horu 'dirt' and tūn 'settlement, farm, estate', presumably meaning 'farm on muddy soil'.

In 1782 the Ilminster Turnpike Trust constructed Jordans Bridge to carry the main road over a stream.

In 1880 Horton House was built as the manor house. It has been designated as a Grade II listed building.

During the late 1970s a small group of children from Channells Lane in Horton got together to form a club called "The Sword of Justice". They decided to try to raise some money for charity and arranged a village fete to raise money for Dr Barnardos. The fete proved very popular and was repeated the following year to raise money for the then very ropey playing field in the village. Again it was a great success and the yearly fete has since gone on to become a very important part of the village's social calendar, known as "Horton fete and flower show" from 2006. The money raised in previous years has been used to build a replacement village hall at the north side of the village. The Horton Flower Show is where local green-fingered individuals can compete for prizes and prestige, amongst which are the biggest marrow competition or best fairy cake.

Governance

The parish council has responsibility for local issues, including setting an annual precept (local rate) to cover the council's operating costs and producing annual accounts for public scrutiny. The parish council evaluates local planning applications and works with the local police, district council officers, and neighbourhood watch groups on matters of crime, security, and traffic. The parish council's role also includes initiating projects for the maintenance and repair of parish facilities, as well as consulting with the district council on the maintenance, repair, and improvement of highways, drainage, footpaths, public transport, and street cleaning. Conservation matters (including trees and listed buildings) and environmental issues are also the responsibility of the council.

The village falls within the Non-metropolitan district of South Somerset, which was formed on 1 April 1974 under the Local Government Act 1972, having previously been part of Chard Rural District. The district council is responsible for local planning and building control, local roads, council housing, environmental health, markets and fairs, refuse collection and recycling, cemeteries and crematoria, leisure services, parks, and tourism.

Somerset County Council is responsible for running the largest and most expensive local services such as education, social services, libraries, main roads, public transport, policing and fire services, trading standards, waste disposal and strategic planning.

It is also part of the Yeovil county constituency represented in the House of Commons of the Parliament of the United Kingdom. It elects one member of parliament (MP) by the first past the post system of election.

References

External links

Villages in South Somerset
Civil parishes in Somerset